The 2012–13 Scottish League Cup was the 67th season of Scotland's second-most prestigious football knockout competition. It is also known as the Scottish Communities League Cup for sponsorship reasons, after the Scottish Government continued their 1.7 million sponsorship for a second season.

Format
The competition is a single elimination knock-out competition. In each round, fixtures are determined by random draw, with the first to third rounds seeded according to last season's league positions (higher 50% of finishers drawn v lower 50% of finishers, alternating which is at home with each tie drawn).

Fixtures are played to a finish, with extra time and then penalties used in the event of draws. The competition is open to all clubs in the Scottish Premier League and Scottish Football League. Clubs involved in European competitions are given a bye to the third round in order to avoid congestion of fixtures.

First round: 28 of the 30 sides from the previous season's Scottish Football League enter, except Ross County and Dunfermline. After the liquidation of the original Rangers F.C. the newly formed Rangers joined the Third Division and entered at this round.
Second round: The 15 winners of the first round are joined by 6 of the 7 of last season's SPL sides not in Europe, plus newly promoted Ross County.
Third round: The 11 winners of the second round are joined by the five SPL sides participating in European competition.
Quarter-finals: The 8 winners of the third round play.
Semi-finals: The 4 winners of the quarter-finals play.
Final: The 2 winners of the semi-finals play.

Schedule
Round 1:          Saturday 4 August
Round 2:          Tuesday 28/Wednesday 29 August
Round 3:          Tuesday 25/Wednesday 26 September
Quarter-Finals:   Tuesday 30/Wednesday 31 October
Semi-Finals:      Saturday 26/Sunday 27 January 2013
Final:            Sunday 17 March 2013

Fixtures and results

First round
The first round draw was conducted on 20 July 2012 at Ochilview Park, Stenhousemuir by the First Minister of Scotland, Alex Salmond. Rangers were entered into the draw pending an application for membership of the Scottish Football Association, which is needed to participate.

Second round
The Second round draw was conducted on 9 August 2012.

Third round
The third round draw took place on 3 September 2012. The matches were played on Tuesday 25 or Wednesday 26 September 2012.

Quarter-finals
The quarter-final draw took place on 4 October 2012. The matches were played on Tuesday 30 or Wednesday 31 October 2012.

Semi-finals
The semi-final draw took place on 8 November 2012. The first match was played on Saturday 26 and the second was played on Sunday 27 January 2013.

Final

References

External links
 Official site
 Results Soccerway

Scottish League Cup seasons
Cup
2012–13 in Scottish football cups